Idmon fujianana is a butterfly in the family Hesperiidae. It is endemic to the province of Fujian, China.

References

Butterflies described in 1994
Ancistroidini